Neanderthal Planet is a collection of science fiction short stories written by Brian W. Aldiss and published separately in 1959,1960, 1962, and together in 1969 by special arrangement with the author; it was next published by Avon Books in January, 1970.

Contents

This novel-length book consists of the following four short stories:

 "Neanderthal Planet" (47 pages).
 "Danger: Religion!" (62 pages).
 "Intangibles, Inc." (25 pages).   A man bets an agent of Intangibles, Inc., that he won't pick up, move, or remove a salt shaker from his table top.  Ever.
 "Since the Assassination" (47 pages).

See also
 List of science fiction novels

External links
 Neanderthal Planet title listing at the Internet Speculative Fiction Database

Works by Brian Aldiss
Science fiction short story collections
1970 short story collections
Avon (publisher) books